List of airlines in Montenegro, grouped by type.

Scheduled Airlines

Charter airlines
 Di Air (Podgorica Airport, Tivat Airport)
 OKI Air International (Podgorica Airport)
 Vektra Aviation (Podgorica Airport)

See also
 List of airlines of Yugoslavia

References

 
Montenegro
Airlines
Airlines
Montenegro